Passiflora edmundoi is a species in the family Passifloraceae.  It is native to western to southwestern Brazil. It is similar to Passiflora kermesina. It is named after Edmundo Pereira, who collected the type specimen.

edmundoi